Dalaki (also Romanized as Dālakī; also known as Daliki) is a city in the Central District of Dashtestan County, Bushehr province, Iran. At the 2006 census, its population was 7,861 in 1,637 households. The following census in 2011 counted 6,044 people in 1,511 households. The latest census in 2016 showed a population of 6,436 people in 1,846 households.

References 

Cities in Bushehr Province
Populated places in Dashtestan County